Vlad-Sorin Moldoveanu (born February 11, 1988) is a Romanian professional basketball player who last played for CS Dinamo Bucharest. He also represents the Romanian national basketball team in international competition.

Early life
Moldoveanu, a 6'9" forward from Bucharest, is the son of former Romanian women's basketball player Carmen Tocală (born 1962).

College career
After earning All-Metropolitan honors at St. John's College High School in Washington, DC, he began playing college basketball at George Mason University, where he played sparingly and averaged 2.3 points and 2.1 rebounds per game over two seasons. He then transferred to American University, where he enjoyed a breakout junior year. Moldoveanu averaged 18.1 points and 6.5 rebounds per game and was named first team All-Patriot League. As a senior in 2010–11, he increased his scoring to 20.1 per game and was again named first team all-conference. In his last year of college, he was also named to the Reese's College All-Star Game and was the Oscar Robertson Player of the Week for the week of January 9, 2011 after averaging 31.5 points and 9.5 rebounds per game during that week.

During his collegiate career, he scored 1,098 points.

Professional career
After going undrafted in the 2011 NBA draft, Moldoveanu signed a contract with the Italian team Benetton Treviso. In his first season as a professional player, he averaged 6.7 points per game in 37 games. For the 2012–13 season, he signed with the French team Le Havre. In 2012 and 2013, he has been named the Romanian Player of the Year. In August 2013, he signed a one-year deal with Kalev/Cramo.

On July 18, 2014, he signed a contract with the Polish team Turów Zgorzelec. On July 11, 2015, he signed with Stelmet Zielona Góra. On June 20, 2016, he signed with U-Banca Transilvania.

On July 4, 2017, Moldoveanu signed with Turkish club Büyükçekmece Basketbol for the 2017–18 season.

On July 10, 2018, Moldoveanu returned to U BT Cluj-Napoca.

On August 2, 2019, Moldoveanu moved to Greece and signed with Ifaistos Limnou.

National team career
Moldoveanu represents the Romanian national basketball team. He played at the EuroBasket 2017.

Awards and accomplishments

Club
Kalev/Cramo
 Korvpalli Meistriliiga: (2014)
Turow Zgorzelec
  Polish Basketball Super Cup : (2015)
Zielona Góra
 Polish Basketball League: (2016)
  Polish Basketball Super Cup : (2016)
U-BT Cluj-Napoca
 Liga Națională: (2017)
Romanian Cup: (2017)
 2x  Super Cup: (2017,2019)
Voluntari
 2× Romanian Cup: (2021, 2022)

Individual
 All-Tournament FIBA Europe Under-18 Championship First Team: 2006 
 D.C. All-Metro First Team: 2007
 All-Patriot League First Team: 2010, 2011
 NABC Division I All-District 13 First Team: 2011
 College All-Star Game Participant (Houston, Texas, USA)
 KML Finals MVP: (2014)
 KML Best Foreigner: (2014)
 3× Romanian League Player of the Year: (2012, 2013, 2017)
 Second Team All-Bosman in PLK: (2016)
 First Team All-Romanian League: (2017)
 Romanian League Forward of the Year: (2017)

References

External links
Vlad Moldoveanu at aueagles.com
Vlad Moldoveanu at fiba.com
Vlad Moldoveanu at euroleague.net
Vlad Moldoveanu at legabasket.it 
Vlad Moldoveanu at lnb.fr 
A great opportunity at euroleague.net (Vlad Moldoveanu Blog)

1988 births
Living people
American Eagles men's basketball players
Basket Zielona Góra players
Basketball players from Bucharest
BC Kalev/Cramo players
Büyükçekmece Basketbol players
CS Universitatea Cluj-Napoca (men's basketball) players
CSO Voluntari players
Romanian expatriate basketball people in Estonia
Romanian expatriate basketball people in Turkey
Romanian expatriate basketball people in Greece
George Mason Patriots men's basketball players
Ifaistos Limnou B.C. players
Korvpalli Meistriliiga players
Lega Basket Serie A players
Pallacanestro Treviso players
Power forwards (basketball)
Romanian expatriate basketball people in France
Romanian expatriate basketball people in the United States
Romanian expatriate basketball people in Italy
Romanian expatriate basketball people in Poland
Romanian men's basketball players
STB Le Havre players
Turów Zgorzelec players